The women's high jump event at the 2014 Asian Games was held at the Incheon Asiad Main Stadium, Incheon, South Korea on 2 October.

Schedule
All times are Korea Standard Time (UTC+09:00)

Records

Results

References

Results

High jump
2014 women